Talbot is an English Old French-origin surname. Notable people with the name include: 

 Albert Talbot (1877–1936), Anglican Dean of Sydney
 Andre Talbot (born 1978), Canadian football player
 Antonio Talbot (1900–1980), Canadian politician
 Arthur Newell Talbot (1857–1942), American civil engineer
 Billy Talbot (born 1943), American singer-songwriter
 Brian Talbot (born 1953), English footballer
 Bryan Talbot (born 1952), British comic book artist
 Cam Talbot (born 1987), Canadian ice hockey goaltender
 Charles Talbot, 1st Baron Talbot of Hensol (1685–1737), British lawyer and politician 
 Charles Talbot, 1st Duke of Shrewsbury (1660–1718), English politician 
 Christopher Rice Mansel Talbot (1803–1890), Welsh industrialist and politician 
 Colin Talbot (born 1952), British political scientist professor
 Connie Talbot (born 2000), English singer
 David Talbot (born 1951), American journalist
 David Talbot (golfer) (born 1936), English golfer
 Drew Talbot (born 1986), English footballer
 Don Talbot (1933–2020), Australian swimming coach
 Lady Eleanor Talbot (c.1436–1468), English noblewoman
 Edward Allen Talbot (1796–1839), British-Canadian settler
 Edward Talbot (bishop) (1844–1934), English bishop of Rochester, Southwark then Winchester
 Edward Talbot, 8th Earl of Shrewsbury (1561–1617), English nobleman and politician 
 Emily Charlotte Talbot (1840–1918), Welsh heiress and daughter of Christopher Rice Mansel Talbot
 Ethelbert Talbot (1848–1928), American bishop
 Frances Talbot, Countess of Morley (1782–1857), English author and artist
 Francis Talbot, 5th Earl of Shrewsbury (1500–1560), English nobleman 
 Francis X. Talbot (1889–1953), American Jesuit publisher and academic administrator
 Fred Talbot (born 1949), British television presenter
 Geoffrey Talbot (died c.1140), English nobleman
 George Talbot (disambiguation), several people, including several earls of Shrewsbury
 Gerald Talbot (born 1931), American politician
 Gilbert Talbot, 7th Earl of Shrewsbury (1552–1616), English aristocrat and politician
 Grover C. Talbot (1885–1935), American politician
 (William) Henry Fox Talbot (1800–1877), British inventor and photography pioneer
 Isham Talbot (1773–1837), American politician
 Jacques Talbot, historical figure in New France
 James Talbot (disambiguation), several people
 Jean-Guy Talbot, Canadian ice hockey player
 Jean-Pierre Talbot, Belgian actor
 Joby Talbot, 20th century British classical composer
 Joe Talbot (born 1991), American filmmaker
 Joe Talbot (musician) (born 1984), Welsh musician
 John Talbot (disambiguation), several people
 Kirk Talbot (born 1969), Louisiana politician
 Larry Talbot, title character in the 1941 film The Wolf Man
 Les Talbot, English footballer
 Lyle Talbot, American actor
 Mary Talbot (disambiguation), several people
 Matt Talbot, Irish alcoholic who turned to Christianity
 Maxime Talbot, Canadian ice hockey player
 Michael Talbot (disambiguation), several people
 Mick Talbot, English keyboardist
 Mignon Talbot, American paleontologist
 Milo Talbot (British Army officer) (1854–1931)
 Milo Talbot, 7th Baron Talbot of Malahide (1912–1973)
 Montague Talbot (1774–1831), Irish actor and theatre manager
 Nita Talbot, American actress
 P. H. Talbot, captain of the USS Helm
 Paul Talbot (born 1979), English professional footballer
 Peter Talbot (politician), Canadian politician
 Archbishop Peter Talbot, Catholic Archbishop of Dublin
 Philippe Adjutor Talbot, Canadian politician
 Phillips Talbot, American diplomat
 Rachel Talbot Ross, American politician
 Ralph Talbot, US Marine flyer
 Richard Talbot, 1st Earl of Tyrconnell (1630–1691), Irish politician, courtier and soldier
 Richard Talbot (colonizer), Irish settler in Upper Canada
 Rhisiart Tal-e-bot, born Richard Talbot, British political activist
 Scott Talbot, Australian-born New Zealand swimmer and swimming coach
 Silas Talbot, captain of the USS Constitution
 Siobhán Talbot (born 1964), Irish businesswoman, CEO of Glanbia
 Stephanie Talbot (born 1994), Australian basketball player
 Thomas Talbot (Upper Canada), 19th-century Canadian politician
 Thomas Talbot (Massachusetts politician), 19th-century governor of Massachusetts
 Thomas Talbot, 2nd Viscount Lisle
 William Talbot (1658–1730), British Anglican bishop
 William Talbot, 1st Earl Talbot

Fictional characters 
Chloe Talbot, from The Simpsons
 David Talbot (The Vampire Chronicles), from The Vampire Chronicles
 Glenn Talbot, character in the Marvel Universe
Larry Talbot, the protagonist of the film The Wolf Man
 Joe Talbot, a character in the children's TV series Wishbone
 Henry Talbot, a character in the TV series Downton Abbey and subsequent film

Other uses 
As a given name: 
 Talbot Hobbs, Australian architect
 Talbot Mundy, writer of adventure stories
 Talbot Rothwell, English screenwriter

As an aristocratic family name, the Earls of Shrewsbury: 
John Talbot, 1st Earl of Shrewsbury (1390–1453)
John Talbot, 2nd Earl of Shrewsbury (1413–1460)
John Talbot, 3rd Earl of Shrewsbury (1448–1473)
George Talbot, 4th Earl of Shrewsbury (1468–1538)
Francis Talbot, 5th Earl of Shrewsbury (1500–1560)
George Talbot, 6th Earl of Shrewsbury (1522–1590)
Gilbert Talbot, 7th Earl of Shrewsbury (1552–1616)
Edward Talbot, 8th Earl of Shrewsbury (1561–1617)
George Talbot, 9th Earl of Shrewsbury (1567–1630)
John Talbot, 10th Earl of Shrewsbury (1601–1654)
Francis Talbot, 11th Earl of Shrewsbury (1623–1667)
Charles Talbot, 1st Duke of Shrewsbury, 12th Earl of Shrewsbury (1660–1718) (became Duke in 1694, dukedom extinct 1718)
Gilbert Talbot, 13th Earl of Shrewsbury (1673–1743)
George Talbot, 14th Earl of Shrewsbury (1719–1787)
Charles Talbot, 15th Earl of Shrewsbury (1753–1827)
John Talbot, 16th Earl of Shrewsbury (1791–1852)
Bertram Arthur Talbot, 17th Earl of Shrewsbury (1832–1856)
Henry John Chetwynd-Talbot, 18th Earl of Shrewsbury, 3rd Earl Talbot (1803–1868)
Charles John Chetwynd-Talbot, 19th Earl of Shrewsbury, 4th Earl Talbot (1830–1877)
Charles Henry John Chetwynd-Talbot, 20th Earl of Shrewsbury, 5th Earl Talbot (1860–1921)
John George Charles Henry Alton Alexander Chetwynd-Talbot, 21st Earl of Shrewsbury, 6th Earl Talbot (1914–1980)
Charles Henry John Benedict Crofton Chetwynd Chetwynd-Talbot, 22nd Earl of Shrewsbury, 7th Earl Talbot (b. 1952)
his son and heir: James Chetwynd-Talbot, Viscount Ingestre (b. 1978)

See also
 Talbot (disambiguation)
 Baron Lisle, family name
 Baron Talbot of Hensol, Earl Talbot of Hensol, family name
 Baron Talbot of Malahide
 Talbut

English-language surnames
Surnames of Norman origin